The 2021 AFC Cup group stage was played from 14 May to 24 August 2021. A total of 38 teams should have competed in the group stage to decide the 12 places in the knockout stage of the 2021 AFC Cup.

Draw

The draw for the group stage was held on 27 January 2021, 14:30 MYT (UTC+8), at the AFC House in Kuala Lumpur, Malaysia. The 38 teams were drawn into nine groups of four and one group of three (in the Central Asia Zone): three groups each in the West Asia Zone (Groups A–C) and the ASEAN Zone (Groups G–I), two groups in the Central Asia Zone (Groups E–F), and one group each in the South Asia Zone (Group D) and the East Asia Zone (Group J). For each zone, teams were seeded into four pots and drawn into the relevant positions within each group, based on their association ranking and their seeding within their association, in consideration of technical balance between groups. Teams from the same association in zones with more than one group (West Asia Zone, Central Asia Zone, and ASEAN Zone) could not be drawn into the same group.

Originally, 39 teams entered into the group stage draw, which included the 35 direct entrants and the four winners of the play-off round of the qualifying play-offs, whose identity was not known at the time of the draw. However, after the withdrawal of teams from Oman and Myanmar, and promotion of Kaya–Iloilo to AFC Champions League group stage, only 37 teams would compete, including 34 direct entrants, one winner of the play-off round, and two winners of the preliminary round.

Standby teams
 Ayeyawady United (for Shan United)

Format

In the group stage, each group was played on a single round-robin basis in centralised venues. The following teams advanced to the knockout stage:
The winners of each group and the best runners-up in the West Asia Zone and the ASEAN Zone advanced to the Zonal semi-finals.
The winners of each group in the Central Asia Zone advanced to the Zonal finals.
The winners of each group in the South Asia Zone and the East Asia Zone advanced to the Inter-zone play-off semi-finals.

Tiebreakers

The teams were ranked according to points (3 points for a win, 1 point for a draw, 0 points for a loss). If tied on points, tiebreakers were applied in the following order (Regulations Article 8.3):
Points in head-to-head matches among tied teams;
Goal difference in head-to-head matches among tied teams;
Goals scored in head-to-head matches among tied teams;
Away goals scored in head-to-head matches among tied teams; (not applicable since the matches were played in a centralised venue)
If more than two teams are tied, and after applying all head-to-head criteria above, a subset of teams are still tied, all head-to-head criteria above are reapplied exclusively to this subset of teams;
Goal difference in all group matches;
Goals scored in all group matches;
Penalty shoot-out if only two teams playing each other in the last round of the group are tied;
Disciplinary points (yellow card = 1 point, red card as a result of two yellow cards = 3 points, direct red card = 3 points, yellow card followed by direct red card = 4 points);
Association ranking;
Drawing of lots.

Schedule
The schedule of each matchday was as follows.

Centralised venues
On 1 March 2021, AFC confirmed the hosts for the group stage, except for Group G whose hosts were decided later.
Group A: Manama, Bahrain (Al Muharraq Stadium)
Group B: Amman, Jordan (King Abdullah II Stadium)
Group C: Amman, Jordan (Amman International Stadium)
Group D: Malé, Maldives (National Football Stadium)
Group E: Bishkek, Kyrgyzstan (Dolen Omurzakov Stadium)
Group F: Dushanbe, Tajikistan (Pamir Stadium)
Group J: Hong Kong (Hong Kong Stadium & Tseung Kwan O Sports Ground)

Groups

Group A

Group B

Group C

Group D

Group E

Group F

Group G (cancelled)

Group H (cancelled)

Group I (cancelled)

Group J

Ranking of runner-up teams

West Asia Zone

ASEAN Zone (Cancelled)

Notes

References

External links

AFC Cup 2021 , stats.the-AFC.com

2
May 2021 sports events in Asia
June 2021 sports events in Asia
July 2021 sports events in Asia
August 2021 sports events in Asia